Emmanuel Chukwudi Eze  (18 January 196330 December 2007) was a Nigerian philosopher. Eze was a specialist in postcolonial philosophy. He wrote as well as edited influential postcolonial histories of philosophy in Africa, Europe, and the Americas.  He brought Immanuel Kant's racism to light among Western thinkers in the 1990s, an area of Kant's life that Western philosophers often gloss over. Influences in his own work include Paulin Hountondji, Richard Rorty, David Hume, and Immanuel Kant.

At the time of his death, Eze was Associate Professor of Philosophy at DePaul University, where he also edited the journal Philosophia Africana . He died on December 30, 2007, in Lewisburg, Pennsylvania after a short illness.

Background
Eze was born to Nigerian parents, Daniel and Rebecca (who are Igbo and devout Catholics), in Agbokete, in what was Northern Region of Nigeria. Because of his parents' ethnicity and religion they fled the North during the Nigerian Civil War to Nsukka, in the eastern part of the country.

Education and teaching
Eze was educated by Jesuits in colleges in Benin City, Nigeria and Kimwenza, Zaire (now Democratic Republic of Congo). He attended St. Patrick's Elementary School in Iheakpu-Awka from 1970 to 1976. In 1982 he graduated from Igbo-Eze Secondary School. From September of the same year he worked as Clerk at the Kaduna State Ministry of Agriculture in Funtua.

In 1983 Eze resigned the job and enrolled at St. Ignatius Jesuit Novitiate in Benin City. From 1985 to 1987 he studied at S. Pierre Canisius College in Kimwenza, in the Democratic Republic of Congo. He then taught French language at Bishop Kelly College in Benin City for an academic year before moving to New York. He received his Masters (1989) and Ph.D. (1993) from Fordham University. His doctoral thesis was on "Rationality and the Debates about African Philosophy."

Eze taught at Bucknell University and at Mount Holyoke College. In addition, he was a post-doctoral visiting scholar at Cambridge University (1996–1997, where he designed the M.Phil. program in African Studies), a visiting professor at the New School for Social Research (1997) and at the University of Cape Town (2003).

Works

Books
 On Reason: Rationality in a World of Cultural Conflict and Racism (2008)  
 Race and the Enlightenment: A Reader (1997), . 
Postcolonial African Philosophy: A Critical Reader (1997), .
 Achieving our Humanity: The Idea of the Postracial Future (2001), .
African Philosophy: An Anthology(2006), .
Pensamiento Africano (I): Ética y política, . 
Pensamiento Africano (II): Filosofía, . 
Pensamieto Africano (III): Cultura y Sociedad, .

Articles
 "Out of Africa: Communication Theory and Cultural Hegemony". Telos 111 (Spring 1998). New York: Telos Press

See also
Africana philosophy
African philosophy
American philosophy
List of American philosophers

Notes

Further reading
Carmen L. Bohórquez, “Apel, Dussel, Wiredu and Eze: An Intercultural Approach to the Ideal of Justice,” Revista de Filosofia, Vol. 34, No. 1 (2000): 7–16.
Michael A. Rosenthal, “'The black, scabby Brazilian': Some Thoughts on Race and Early Modern Philosophy,” Philosophy and Social Criticism, Vo.l 31, No. 2 (2005): 211–221.
M.L. Thomas, "The Consensus-Democracy Model of the Akan as an Alternative Approach to Political Decision Making.” 

On “Achieving our Humanity: The Idea of the Postracial Future”

Review by Frank M. Kirkland, in Notre Dame Philosophical Review, 2002.04.05 
Review by Cleavis Headley, “The Ideal of the Postracial Future,” in Philosophia Africana, Vol. 7, No. 1, 2004:109–202.
Critique by Charles Mills, "Kant's Untermenschen," in Andrew Valls, Race and Racism in Modern Philosophy, Cornell University Press, 2005, pp. 169–193.

On “Race and the Enlightenment: A Reader”:

Review by Peter Hulme, Research in African Literatures, Vol. 31, No. 2, 2000: 232–233 
Review by Bob Carter, “Out of Africa: Philosophy, 'race' and agency ,” in Radical Philosophy, May/June 1998. 
Review by Andrew N. Carpenter, in Teaching Philosophy, Vol. 23 No. 3 (2000).
Review by Felmon Davis, in Constellations, Vol. 5, No. 2, 1998: 296–304 
Review in Journal of Blacks in Higher Education,  No. 16, 1997: 137–138
Review by Adam Shatz, “What has the worst of the Enlightenment have to do with the best of it?,” Lingua Franca, April–May 1997, pp. 19–20

On “Postcolonial African Philosophy: A Critical Reader”:

Review by Kai Kresse, in polylog: Forum for Intercultural Philosophy 
Review in Philosopher's Magazine. 
Review in The Sociological Review, Vol. 45, No. 4, 1997: 704–750 
Review in Transformation, Vol. 18, No. 4, 2001: 264 

On “African Philosophy: An Anthology”:

Review by Barry Hallen, “African Philosophy in a New Key,” in African Studies Review,  Vol. 43,  No. 3, 2000: 131–134.
Review by Stephen Clark, “African Philosophy: an anthology,” in Afr Aff (Lond), 1999 98: 128–130.
Review by Nigel Gibson, in African and Asian Studies, Vol. 36, No. 3, 2001: 253–329.
Review by Rodney C. Roberts, in Philosophy East and West,  October, 1999

External links
Democracy or Consensus? Response to Wiredu by Emmanuel Chukwudi Eze
African Philosophy at the Turn of the Millennium Interview with Rick Lewis

Igbo philosophers
American people of Igbo descent
Nigerian emigrants to the United States
DePaul University faculty
Mount Holyoke College faculty
1963 births
2007 deaths
20th-century Nigerian philosophers
20th-century American philosophers